Adrian Lydon (born 1976) is a reporter/producer for CNN, he previously worked as television reporter for the Nine O'Clock News on Raidió Teilifís Éireann (RTÉ).

Lydon was responsible for the first media reports on the Leas Cross scandal and the Bank of Ireland stolen laptop story.

A native of Oughterard, County Galway, he was first a newsreader on Galway Bay FM and moved to 2006. He has been an RTÉ news reporter since January 2008.

Adrian holds a degree in media from Mary Immaculate College, in Limerick and a masters in journalism from Dublin City University.

References
 Galway Now, June 2008

External links
 http://www.rte.ie/news/2006/1110/leascross_av.html?2190796,null,209
 http://www.rte.ie/news/2006/1110/leascross.html
 https://web.archive.org/web/20090123233743/http://www.lcnhi.ie/other_docs/

1976 births
Living people
Galway Bay FM presenters
People from County Galway
RTÉ newsreaders and journalists
Alumni of Mary Immaculate College, Limerick
Alumni of Dublin City University